Delmas Obou (born 25 October 1991) is an Italian male sprinter, which participated at the 2013 World Championships in Athletics.

Biography
His parents are from Ivory Coast and moved to Italy in 1993, he reached them in 1999 at the age of eight, so he soon became Italian citizen.

Achievements

National titles
He won 3 national championships at individual senior level.
Italian Athletics Championships
100 metres: 2013, 2014
Italian Indoor Athletics Championships
60 metres: 2015

Bobsleigh

References

External links
 

1991 births
Athletics competitors of Fiamme Gialle
Italian male sprinters
World Athletics Championships athletes for Italy
Living people
Italian Athletics Championships winners
Bobsledders at the 2022 Winter Olympics
Olympic bobsledders of Italy
21st-century Italian people